Folate transporter 1 is a protein which in humans is encoded by the SLC19A1 gene.

Function 

Transport of folate compounds into mammalian cells can occur via receptor-mediated (see folate receptor 1) or carrier-mediated mechanisms. A functional coordination between these 2 mechanisms has been proposed to be the method of folate uptake in certain cell types. Methotrexate (MTX) is an antifolate chemotherapeutic agent that is actively transported by the carrier-mediated uptake system. RFC1 plays a role in maintaining intracellular concentrations of folate. SLC19A1 has also been shown to transport the immune second messenger 2'3'-cGAMP.

Clinical significance 

Individuals carrying a specific polymorphism of SLC19A1 (c.80GG) have lower levels of folate. Other studies have also shown that individuals carrying the c.80AA polymorphism who are treated with methotrexate have higher levels of this anti-folate chemotherapeutic agent. Personalized dosing of the drug depending on the patient's genotype may therefore be required.

Alternative names 
 Reduced folate carrier 1
 Intestinal folate carrier 1

See also 
 Solute carrier family
 Folate-binding protein
 Reduced folate carrier family

References

Further reading 

 
 
 
 
 
 
 
 
 
 
 
 
 
 
 
 
 
 
 
 

Solute carrier family